Shehyee is a self-titled debut album of Filipino hip hop artist and rapper Shehyee, released October 11, 2013. It is produced by Bojam and Thyro of FlipMusic Records and featured 12 tracks mostly self-composed by Shehyee.

Track listing

References

2013 debut albums
Viva Records (Philippines) albums